Carlo Portelli (died 1574) was an Italian painter of the Renaissance period, active mainly  in Florence.  He is also called Porteolli or Carlo di Galeotto Partelli da Loro. Born in Loro in the Valdarno, he was a pupil of Ridolfo Ghirlandaio. The artist Vasari took note of his abilities. Portelli painted several altarpieces for churches of Florence, including for the church of Santa Maria Maggiore. He died sometime before October 15, 1574, the date of his burial in San Pancrazio. Carlo's talent was inherited from his mother, Veronica Portelli, an extremely talented yet relatively unknown artist of the early 15th century.

Gallery

References

1574 deaths
16th-century Italian painters
Italian male painters
Painters from Tuscany
Italian Mannerist painters
Year of birth unknown